Revolutionens datter (The Daughter of the Revolution) is a Norwegian silent film from 1918 directed by Ottar Gladtvet. It has been restored and preserved.

Plot
The film tells the story of Albert Fjeld, a worker at a shipyard, and Claire Staalhammer, the shipyard manager's daughter. Albert acts as a spokesman for the workers when they make a demand for a pay rise, which Staalhammer rejects. The workers do not accept this, and they start a revolt. Albert, who has fallen in love with Claire, manages to save her when the workers storm the manager's residence, and they flee to a neighboring country, where Claire gets to live with a friend of her father, the landowner Dalton. Dalton's son tries to impress Claire, but she is not interested in him. Claire is eventually told that order has been restored in her home country, and that she has inherited almost a million kroner. Because of the money, the landowner Dalton is happy to see his son marry Claire, and she feels it would be rude to refuse outright because Dalton has shown her great hospitality. She therefore proposes a boxing match between Albert and the landowner's son to decide who will marry her. Albert wins the match, and five years later we see them living happily in their homeland.

Cast
Solveig Gladtvet as Claire Staalhammer, the daughter of the shipyard manager
Fredrik Andersen as Staalhammer, the manager of the Wulkan Shipyard
Fred Boston as Jack Dalton, the landowner's son
Thomas Boston as Tommy Fjeld, Albert and Claire's son
Waldemar Holberg as Albert Fjeld, a sheet metal worker
Johannes Price as Dalton, the landowner

References

External links

Revolutionens datter at the National Library of Norway
Revolutionens datter at Filmfront

1918 films
Norwegian silent films
Norwegian black-and-white films
Lost Norwegian films
Norwegian silent short films
Norwegian drama films